The 2022 World Junior Ice Hockey Championships were the 46th edition of the IIHF World Junior Championship, played from August 9–20, 2022 at Rogers Place in Edmonton, Alberta, Canada.

The tournament was originally scheduled to be held from December 26, 2021, through January 5, 2022, in Edmonton and Red Deer — the host cities originally awarded the 2021 tournament before it was moved into a "bubble" behind closed doors in Edmonton due to the COVID-19 pandemic. After COVID-19 outbreaks on multiple teams, the tournament was cancelled by the IIHF on December 29, 2021. In February 2022, it was announced that the tournament would be replayed from scratch at a later date, with all statistics and results from the first playing being thrown out. Once again, the tournament was held exclusively in Edmonton.

This marked the 17th time that Canada hosted the WJIHC. Due to the Russian invasion of Ukraine, Russia was suspended from international ice hockey and replaced by Latvia (which was promoted to the tournament's top division after finishing second in the Division 1-A tournament in December 2021). The country notably achieved its first-ever victory in a preliminary game. In the gold medal game, Canada beat Finland 3–2 in overtime to win its 19th tournament title.

Background

Preparations
On March 14, 2019, it was announced that Gothenburg would be the host city. It was to be the first time that Gothenburg has hosted the tournament (having previously hosted the Senior Ice Hockey World Championships twice in 1981 and 2002), and the seventh time that Sweden had hosted the tournament.

On September 17, 2020, the IIHF announced that the 2022 tournament would instead be hosted by Edmonton and Red Deer, Alberta as compensation for the 2021 tournament (which was originally to be hosted by both cities) being held behind closed doors exclusively in Edmonton due to the COVID-19 pandemic. It became the 15th time that Canada has hosted the tournament, the fourth time Edmonton has hosted the tournament, and the second time games have been hosted in Red Deer, following the 1995 edition. Gothenburg was re-assigned the 2024 tournament.

On December 18, 2021, citing the "changing epidemiological situation" involving COVID-19 and Omicron variant, and consultation with the IIHF and Alberta Health Services, Hockey Canada announced that the schedule of pre-tournament games (which was to feature each team playing at least two exhibition games) would be reduced, and moved to December 23. Organizers stated that their goal was to hold a "safe and successful event," and that 90% of tickets had been sold. There were no stated plans to reduce spectator capacity.

As a participant in the provincial "Restrictions Exemption Program" (REP), Rogers Place was allowed to operate at full capacity, but all spectators were required to present proof of COVID-19 vaccinations. On December 21, as part of public health orders to control Omicron variant, the Alberta provincial government ordered all large venues participating in REP to restrict their capacity to 50% effective December 24. Food and drink consumption was prohibited when seated and during intermissions.

Cancellation and rescheduling of tournament due to COVID-19 
Teams were required to quarantine if any one member tested positive for COVID-19, resulting in three games being forfeited by December 29. Citing the health and safety of participants, and that the competitive integrity of the tournament had been compromised by the aforementioned forfeits, the IIHF announced that the remainder of the tournament had been abandoned. However, IIHF president Luc Tardif stated during a press conference that a committee would meet in January to discuss the feasibility of resuming the tournament at a later date, and that "we want to take the next month to think about it and maybe come with a good surprise."

On February 17, 2022, Tardif announced that the tournament would be rescheduled to mid-August 2022, following the U18 Hlinka Gretzky Cup. The tournament would be replayed from the beginning, with all results and statistics from the first attempt thrown out. Rosters from the first playing of the tournament were grandfathered. The following month, it was announced that the tournament replay had been scheduled for August 9–20, 2022, and that it would be hosted exclusively by Edmonton for the second year in a row. Those who had purchased tickets for the first running of the 2022 tournament, or the 2021 tournament, were given priority access to tickets. With Edmonton focusing on the rescheduled tournament, the 2022 Hlinka Gretzky Cup was hosted exclusively by Red Deer.

In condemnation of the 2022 Russian invasion of Ukraine, Russia was suspended from international ice hockey by the IIHF. It was announced that Latvia—who were promoted to the top division for 2023 after finishing second in the Division I-A tournament—would replace Russia for the tournament replay. Division I-A winner Belarus was also banned from international ice hockey for their support of the invasion.

Sponsorship withdrawals and low attendance 
Due to the Hockey Canada sexual assault scandal that emerged in June 2022, a number of major entities suspended their sponsorships and support of Hockey Canada, including BDO, Canadian Tire, Imperial Oil, Recipe Unlimited, Scotiabank, Telus, and Tim Hortons. The city of Edmonton withdrew their marketing for the tournament.  Sportsnet writer Paul D. Grant suggested that sponsors may had also been given the option to receive refunds on sponsorship purchases they had made for the December 2021 running of the tournament after it was cancelled. Besides a placement for IIHF global sponsor Tissot, there were no in-arena sponsor placements during the tournament, with the boards otherwise containing only images of the tournament emblem and ads for the IIHF's official mobile app.

On the eve of the tournament, it was also reported that "thousands" of tickets were still unsold, including tickets for games involving Canada—which had typically been a major draw during editions of the tournament hosted by Canada. The summer scheduling of the tournament, high ticket prices, the Hockey Canada scandals, and the removal of Russia, were cited by the press as potential factors. The first day of the tournament saw minuscule crowds, with its first three games having an announced attendance of 430, 376, and 829 respectively. However, this was based on tickets sold, and the actual number of spectators in attendance was believed to be much lower. Canada's games had moderate levels of attendance, ranging from 2,779 for its first preliminary game, to 5,204 for its final preliminary game—a fraction of Rogers Place's hockey capacity of 18,500. The gold medal game had an official attendance of 13,327.

Group A (December 2021)

Group B (December 2021)

Top division

Venue

Officials
The following officials were assigned by the International Ice Hockey Federation to officiate the 2022 World Junior Championships.

Referees
  Adam Bloski
  Riku Brander
  Sean Fernandez
  Stephen Hiff
  Robert Hennessey
  Christoffer Holm
  Sirko Hunnius
  Adam Kika
  Joonas Kova
  Kyle Kowalski

Linesmen
  Nick Briganti
  Eric Cattaneo
  Andreas Hofer
  Cody Huseby
  Niko Jusi
  Brett Mackey
  Shawn Oliver
  John Rey
  Josef Špůr

Rosters

Teams

Group A
 (2)
 (3)
 (7)
 (8)
 (replacing Russia)

Group B
 (1)
 (5)
 (6)
 (9)
 (10)

Preliminary round
All times are local (UTC-7).

Group A

Group B

Playoff round
Winning teams will be reseeded for the semi-finals in accordance with the following ranking:

higher position in the group
higher number of points
better goal difference
higher number of goals scored for
better seeding coming into the tournament (final placement at the 2021 World Junior Ice Hockey Championships).

Bracket

Quarterfinals

Semifinals

Bronze medal game

Gold medal game

Statistics

Scoring leaders 

GP = Games played; G = Goals; A = Assists; Pts = Points; +/− = Plus–minus; PIM = Penalties In MinutesSource: IIHF.com

Goaltending leaders 

(minimum 40% team's total ice time)

TOI = Time on ice (minutes:seconds); GA = Goals against; GAA = Goals against average; SA = Shots against; Sv% = Save percentage; SO = ShutoutsSource: IIHF.com

Final standings

Awards
Best players selected by the directorate:
Best Goaltender:  Jesper Wallstedt
Best Defenceman:  Kasper Puutio
Best Forward:  Mason McTavish
Source: IIHF

Media All-Stars:
MVP:  Mason McTavish
Goaltender:  Jesper Wallstedt
Defencemen:  Olen Zellweger /  Emil Andrae
Forwards:  Mason McTavish /  Joakim Kemell /  Jan Myšák
Source: IIHF

Division I

Group A
The tournament was held in Hørsholm, Denmark, from 12 to 18 December 2021.

Group B
The tournament was held in Tallinn, Estonia, from 12 to 18 December 2021.

Division II

Group A
The tournament was held in Brașov, Romania, from 13 to 19 December 2021.

Group B
The tournament would have been held in Belgrade, Serbia, from 10 to 16 January 2022, but it was cancelled due to the COVID-19 pandemic. It was rescheduled and took place from 12 to 17 September 2022.

Division III

The tournament would have been held in Querétaro, Mexico, from January 6 to 16, 2022, but was cancelled due to the COVID-19 pandemic. It was rescheduled and played from 22 to 30 July 2022. Bulgaria withdrew from the July tournament and was replaced by Australia, which originally opted out of the January tournament.

Group A

Group B

Playoff round
All teams enter the Quarterfinals; Semifinals are to be re-seeded.

References

External links
 Official site of the 2022 World Junior Championships
 IIHF World Juniors tournaments list
 IIHF World Juniors tournaments Guide

 
2022
World Junior Championships
World Junior Championships
World Junior Championships, 2022
World Junior Championships, 2022
Ice hockey competitions in Edmonton
Sports competitions in Red Deer, Alberta
2021–22 in Canadian ice hockey
World Junior Ice Hockey Championships
Ice hockey events postponed due to the COVID-19 pandemic